WERU-FM (89.9 MHz) is a noncommercial, listener-sponsored community radio station licensed to the town of Blue Hill, Maine.  It is owned by the Salt Pond Community Broadcasting Company.  WERU-FM has studios in East Orland and its transmitter is on Blue Hill Mountain off Mountain Road.

The station has an effective radiated power (ERP) of 12,000 watts, using a tower at 261 meters (856 feet) in height above average terrain (HAAT).  The primary signal stretches from Bangor to Rockland to Bar Harbor in Down East Maine.  In July 2004, the station began streaming online, and in April 2006, started providing podcasts of its spoken word programming.  It holds periodic on-air fundraisers to support the station.

History
WERU-FM signed on the air on May 1, 1988.  The original studios and offices were known as "The Henhouse" in Blue Hill Falls.  From its inception, WERU-FM has been a grassroots, nonprofit organization, volunteer-powered and listener-supported community radio service. Paul Stookey, of the pop group Peter, Paul and Mary, was the station's first benefactor.  A woman, Molly Stauffer, was the first administrative director.

In 1997, the station moved its studios to the current location on U.S. Route 1 in East Orland. In 2005, WERU-FM formed a partnership with Radio Sumpul in Chalatenango, El Salvador, a community radio station started after the Salvadoran Civil War.

Music programming is diverse and includes genres such as folk, Americana, blues, rock, jazz, and reggae.

WERU-FM is a member of the National Federation of Community Broadcasters, World Association of Community Radio Broadcasters, Maine Association of Broadcasters, and Maine Association of Nonprofits. The station is also a founding member of the Grassroots Radio Coalition.

See also
List of community radio stations in the United States

References

External links
WERU official website

Audio Archives of Spoken Word Programming
Podcast Feed

ERU-FM
Community radio stations in the United States
Hancock County, Maine
Radio stations established in 1988